Cychrus pratti is a species of ground beetle in the subfamily of Carabinae. It was described by Breuning in 1946.

References

pratti
Beetles described in 1946